Fluent Design System (codenamed "Project Neon"), officially unveiled as Microsoft Fluent Design System, is a design language developed in 2017 by Microsoft. Fluent Design is a revamp of Microsoft Design Language (popularly known as "Metro") that includes guidelines for the designs and interactions used within software designed for all Windows 10 and Windows 11 devices and platforms. The system is based on five key components: light, depth, motion, material, and scale. The new design language includes more prominent use of motion, depth, and translucency effects.

The transition to Fluent is a long-term project; aspects of the design started appearing in Windows 10 beginning with the "Fall Creators Update" released in October 2017, as well as an update to the Xbox One system software released alongside it. It was later revealed to be designed in conjunction with Windows 10X, in addition to Windows 11 which has a similar design.

Compared to Metro and Aero 
Fluent's key principles, or "blocks" (Light, Depth, Motion, Material, and Scale), turn away from the flat concept Metro had defined, and while preserving the clean look and feel Metro introduced, Fluent renews the visuals of Aero, a design approach that was introduced in Windows Vista and Windows 7, including blurred translucency, parallax animated patterns, drop shadows, highlight effects following mouse pointer or input gesture movements, and "faux materials" Metro once discarded.

Current applications of Fluent

Light

Reveal highlight 
The purpose of light is to draw attention and illuminate information. Upon hovering, the Reveal highlight illuminates nearby hidden borders on objects such as hamburger navigation menu lists and buttons. Upon selection, such as by clicking or tapping, a white circular illumination effect quickly appears. Additionally, in the Windows Holographic environment, a rounded white pointer exists.

On November 6, 2017, Microsoft Employee David Has stated that plans to apply the reveal highlight to the taskbar exist—but , it has not occurred.

With WinUI 2.6, Microsoft has discontinued reveal highlight to match their web and mobile offerings, which do not offer reveal highlight.

Reveal focus 
Focusable items with a border glow via the focus visual.

Depth 
The addition of depth utilizes the z-axis and allows for content differentiation via layering. Depth is presented via drop shadows and Z-depth layering. This is especially apparent in the redesigned Office app in 2019.

Motion 
Motion establishes a relationship between UI elements and provides a continuity in the experience.

Add/delete animations 
List animations for inserting and removing items from a collection.

Connected animations 
Connected animations are item transitions. During a content change, an element appears to continue by flying across the app.

Content transition 
Used when only a portion of content on a page will change.

Drill 
Drill is used when navigating deeper into an app. For example, displaying more information after an item is selected.

Fade 
fade -in and fade-out to bring items into and dismiss them from view.

Parallax 
Parallax moves objects at different rates. The background moves slower than the content above it. For example, a list will scroll faster than the background image, creating a depth effect in addition to motion.

Press feedback 
When an item is pressed, it momentarily recedes into the background and then returns to its original position. Examples of press feedback include the Start menu live tiles, Action Center quick actions, and Microsoft Edge address bar buttons.

Material

Acrylic 
New icons with acrylic materials have been created for Microsoft programs, starting with the Office apps and the Chromium-based Microsoft Edge in 2018 and 2019, respectively. Preliminary versions of the final icons were spotted in the "Meet the New Icons for Office 365" video, before more were spotted when Windows 10X was unveiled, prior to being officially revealed on December 12, 2019. These icons started appearing through Microsoft Store updates to those apps, beginning with Mail and Calendar.

The acrylic material creates a translucent, blurred effect with a slight noise effect. A visual hierarchy can be created by using different opacities. For example, in an app, primary content surfaces are often opaque (with the exception of widgets or lightweight apps such as Calculator), a secondary pane can have 80% background acrylic, and the tertiary pane can have 60% background acrylic. Background acrylic blurs all items behind the active acrylic material. In-app acrylic blurs content within the app.

Acrylic is disabled in a specific window when the app is no longer selected. Both types of acrylic are disabled system-wide when transparency is disabled, when battery saver mode is enabled, or on low-end hardware. Background Acrylic is disabled when a window is deselected or in Windows 10 Mobile, HoloLens, or tablet mode.

Mica 
Mica is a new opaque material introduced in Windows 11 that takes on the tint of the user's wallpaper. Unlike acrylic, which was designed for transient surfaces (e.g., context menus), MMC is designed for use on long-lasting primary surfaces.

Scale 
Apps scale across different form factors, display sizes, and 0D to 3D. Elements adapt to their screen size and are available across multiple dimensions. Conscious controls are also categorized within Scale (e.g. scrollbars and inputs that adapt to different methods of invocation)

Undetermined 
 Spatial sound

See also
 Carbon Design System by IBM
 Material Design
 Flat design
 Windows Aero
 Metro

References

External links 
 
 
 

Design language
Free and open-source software
Graphical user interfaces
Microsoft free software
Software using the MIT license
Windows 10